Elevator girl may refer to:
 Elevator operator
"Elevator Girl", a 2019 song by Babymetal
Elevator Girl, a 2010 Hallmark Channel Original Movie
"Elevator Girl", a 1993 song by Psychotic Youth